The Observer-News-Enterprise is an American, English language daily newspaper headquartered in Newton, Catawba County, North Carolina.  It was founded in 1955 and it is a member of the North Carolina Press Association.

History
The following named newspapers preceded The Observer-News-Enterprise:
 The Observer and News-Enterprise. (Newton, N.C.) 1954-1955
  The Newton Conover twin-city observer and the Catawba news-enterprise. (Newton, N.C.) 1954-1954
 The Catawba news-enterprise. (Newton, N.C.) 1919-1954
 The Newton Conover twin-city observer. (Newton, N.C.) 19??-1954

See also
 List of newspapers in North Carolina

References

Daily newspapers published in North Carolina
Catawba County, North Carolina
Newspapers established in 1955
1955 establishments in North Carolina